Kim Il-woo may refer to:
 Kim Il-woo (actor, born 1953)
 Kim Il-woo (actor, born 1963)